Kevin Curren and Anne Smith held the title but did not defend.

John Lloyd and Wendy Turnbull defeated Steve Denton and Billie Jean King in the final, 6–7(5–7), 7–6(7–5), 7–5 to win the mixed doubles tennis title at the 1983 Wimbledon Championships.

Seeds
All seeds received a bye into the second round. 

  Steve Denton /  Billie Jean King (final)
  John Lloyd /  Wendy Turnbull (champions)
  Sherwood Stewart /  JoAnne Russell (third round)
  Fred Stolle /  Pam Shriver (semifinals)
  John Newcombe /  Andrea Leand (second round)
  Tom Gullikson /  Kathy Jordan (quarterfinals)
  Frew McMillan /  Jo Durie (third round)
  Ferdi Taygan /  Barbara Jordan (third round)

Draw

Finals

Top half

Section 1

Section 2

Bottom half

Section 3

Section 4

References

External links

1983 Wimbledon Championships – Doubles draws and results at the International Tennis Federation

X=Mixed Doubles
1983